Sphenomorphus puncticentralis is a species of skink found in Indonesia.

References

puncticentralis
Reptiles described in 1994